The 1978 National Invitation Tournament was the 1978 edition of the annual NCAA college basketball competition.

Selected teams
Below is a list of the 16 teams selected for the tournament.

 Army
 Dayton
 Detroit
 Fairfield
 Georgetown
 Illinois State
 Indiana State
 Nebraska
 North Carolina State
 Rutgers
 South Carolina
 Temple
 Texas
 Utah State
 VCU
 Virginia

Bracket
Below is the tournament bracket.

See also
 1978 NCAA Division I basketball tournament
 1978 NCAA Division II basketball tournament
 1978 NCAA Division III basketball tournament
 1978 NAIA Division I men's basketball tournament
 1978 National Women's Invitational Tournament

References

National Invitation
National Invitation Tournament
Basketball in New York City
College sports in New York City
Madison Square Garden
National Invitation Tournament
National Invitation Tournament
Sports competitions in New York City
Sports in Manhattan
1970s in Manhattan